Rock Creek or Rockcreek, Oregon may refer to the following in the U.S. state of Oregon:

Communities
Rock Creek, Baker County, Oregon, an unincorporated community 
Rock Creek, Gilliam County, Oregon, an unincorporated community
Rockcreek, Oregon, a census-designated place in Washington County

Streams
 Rock Creek (Catlow Valley), Oregon
 Rock Creek (John Day River tributary), Oregon
 Rock Creek (Lane County, Oregon)
 Rock Creek (Wasco County, Oregon)
 Rock Creek (Washington County, Oregon)